The Durness Group is a geological group, a stratigraphic unit, formed mainly of dolomites of late Cambrian to early Ordovician age. It outcrops along the full strike extent of the Moine Thrust Belt in the Northwest Highlands of Scotland. Within the thrust belt it is often affected by thrust faulting.

References

Geological groups of the United Kingdom
Geologic formations of Scotland
Cambrian System of Europe
Ordovician System of Europe
Ordovician Scotland
Cambrian United Kingdom
Dolomite formations
Mountains and hills of the Northwest Highlands